Hasmonean High School is a secondary school and sixth form with academy status for pupils from Orthodox Jewish families, situated in the London Borough of Barnet, England.

History
The school was founded by the late Rabbi Dr. Solomon Schonfeld in 1944 as Hasmonean Grammar School. Schonfeld (1912–1984) rescued thousands of Jews from the Holocaust and pioneered Jewish day school education in England.

Schonfeld considered there to be a need for an Orthodox Jewish school in North West London, which, despite having high numbers of Orthodox Jews, did not have a religious school to cater for them. Many Jews had reached Great Britain from different parts of Nazi-occupied Europe, most of them settling in London. Since Orthodox Judaism places great emphasis on the upbringing of children, he saw a need for a school where the children could be educated in an Orthodox Jewish environment.

The boys’ school became a voluntary aided Local Authority School in 1957. In September 1975, the girls moved to the present purpose-built Page Street site in Mill Hill. In 1984, voluntary aided status was extended to the girls' school, and the two sections joined as one to become a five-form-entry school. In April 1994, the school became grant maintained, but returned to Voluntary Aided Status in September 1999, following the abolition of grant-maintained schools. In March 2008 Hasmonean was singled out as one of the faith schools in the news for its procedure of demanding contributions from parents as a condition of entry. The school converted to academy status in October 2011.

The school has established a Beis Hamedrash programme for fifth and sixth form boys (Years 11–13) and a Midrasha programme for sixth form girls.

Headteachers
 Walter Stanton M.A.(Oxon.) (1944–1980) founding head
 Rabbi Meir Roberg (1980–1993) 
 Dr Dena Coleman (1993–1998)
 Rabbi David Radomsky (2000–2006)
 Martin Clark (2006–2007)
 David Fuller (2007–2009)
 Rabbi D. Meyer (2009–2015)
 Andrew McClusky (2015–present)

Location
Originally, the school was situated in The Drive in Golders Green until 1947. In that year, the boys' school moved to Holders Hill Road, where it has remained until the present day. Until 1975, the girls' school was accommodated in two large houses in Parson Street, Hendon, when it was relocated to Page Street.

Transport
As of September 2011, the bus route 240 serves the boys site of the school, with access to Golders Green, Edgware and Mill Hill Broadway Stations for all students. At Mill Hill Broadway there is access to the 221 Bus, 113 Bus, 251 Bus. The closest underground station is Mill Hill East.

Governing body
Soon after its opening, the school became part of the Jewish Secondary Schools Movement (JSSM). Under the terms of the JSSM scheme, the trustees of the school must be appointed by the rabbis of certain synagogues, namely, the Adath Yisroel, the Golders Green Beth Hamedrash Congregation and the Hendon Adath Yisroel. The trustees in turn appoint the Foundation Governors, who together with the Headteacher, two LEA appointed Governors, three parent-elected Governors, two teacher-elected Governors and the Staff Governor form the Governing Body. The current chairmen of governors are Gary Swabel (MAT), Yossi Halberstadt (Boys) and Steven Blumgart (Girls).

Academic results

Hasmonean has been commended by SSAT for being in the top 10% of non-selective schools according to the number of students gaining 5 or more A* – A grades. Following an inspection in 2012, Hasmonean is rated 'Outstanding' in all categories by Ofsted.

The school has also been commended for the progress students make between Key Stage 2 and 4, with some subjects being in the top 1% and all being in the top 4% of all schools.

The school has produced students with outstanding GCSE results. At A-level, it is also outstanding, in the top three of non-grammar schools in Barnet Local Authority.

Future
Hasmonean High school has two campuses, one for boys and a separate one for girls, which are over a mile apart. The two campuses share leadership teams and teaching staff, but, in accordance with Hasmonean's ethos, the educational accommodation, external spaces and play areas are separate.

In 2016, Hasmonean proposed moving both the boys’ and girls’ campuses onto one secured site.

 Each campus would sit on its own site and have separate entrances, facilities and play areas. The land identified at this stage is the land next to, and including, the current girls’ campus on Page Street. Each campus would also have its own security team. The redevelopment plans were subsequently rejected by the Mayor of London.

Notable former pupils
 Alan Howard, Hedge Fund Manager
 Dina Rabinovitch, journalist
 Polina Bayvel, CBE, FRS, Engineer and Academic

Hasmonean Grammar School
 His Honour Judge Nigel Peters QC
 Samson Abramsky, professor of Computer Science
 David Landau (journalist)
 Norman Lebrecht, writer and broadcaster
 Edward Mirzoeff, BBC producer
 Prof David Newman, Dean of the Faculty of Humanities and Social Sciences at Ben-Gurion University in Israel.

References

External links
 Official Website
 Future
 Alumni Website
 EduBase
 Department of Education performance tables

Educational institutions established in 1944
Orthodox Jewish educational institutions
Orthodox Judaism in London
Academies in the London Borough of Barnet
Jewish schools in England
Secondary schools in the London Borough of Barnet
1944 establishments in England
Hendon